The median raphe nucleus (MRN or MnR), also known as the nucleus raphes medianus (NRM) or superior central nucleus, is a brain region composed of polygonal, fusiform, and piriform neurons, which exists rostral to the nucleus raphes pontis. The MRN is located between the posterior end of the superior cerebellar peduncles and the V. Afferents of the motor nucleus. It is one of two nuclei, the other being the dorsal raphe nucleus (DnR), in the midbrain-pons.

The MRN projects extensively to the hippocampus, which is known to be essential for the formation of long-term memory. One recent study found that this raphe–hippocampus pathway plays a critical role in regulation of hippocampal activity and likely associated memory consolidation processes. It has also been found to play a role in anxiety and depression, as one of the few parts of the brain that creates tryptophan hydroxylase.

Description 
The median raphe nucleus contains 5-hydroxytryptamine (serotonin, 5-HT) cell bodies that give rise to the majority of the ascending 5-HT projections to the forebrain limbic areas that control emotional behavior. Because a dense population of neurons in the median raphe nucleus primarily contain serotonin, a prominent neurotransmitter in the median raphe nucleus is serotonin (5-HT). Projections from the MRN extend to forebrain structures. Distinct projection areas of the MnR innervates the medial septum, cingulate and dorsal hippocampus. According to a study by McKenna and Vertes, around 8–12% of cells of the MnR were retrogradely double-labeled after paired injections in the Medial septum CA1 region, Medial Septum CA3 region, Medial Septum Dentate Gyrus of the dorsal hippocampus, the lateral Medial Septum Dentate Gyrus, and the Medial Septum ventral hippocampus. These cells of the MnR that send collateral projections to the Medial Septum and hippocampus may serve a unique role in modulation of desynchronization of hippocampus EEG. Also, the MnR has significantly more single- and double-labeled cells after paired injections to the various Medial Septum and hippocampus regions than in DnR which demonstrate that MnR has more stronger projections to the Medial Septum and hippocampus than the DnR. MnR fibers are course and large with spherical varicosities. Neurotoxic 5-HT-releasing agents selectively destroy DnR projection fibers without affecting the dense coarse fibers from the MnR. Most of the fibers that distribute to the medial septum terminate selectively within the medial septum-vertical limb of the diagonal band nucleus (MS/DBv) and lateral aspects of lateral septum. Most of the pronounced projections to hippocampal formation (HF) distribute to the stratum lacunosum-molecular of Ammon’s horn and granule cell layer and adjacent inner molecular layer of the dentate gyrus (DG).

Projections stemming from the MRN modulate dopaminergic activity within the forebrain. Additionally MnR projections are part of a behavioral disinhibition/inhibition system that produces phenotypes resembling behavioral variations manifested during manic and depressive phases of bipolar disorder.

Inhibition of the MRN in cats by lysergic acid diethylamide (LSD) and psilocin, two serotonin agonist hallucinogens, leads to dose dependent behavioral changes, indicating the MRN may be an important site of action for humans hallucinations.

The MRN projects extensively to the hippocampus, which is known to be essential for the formation of long-term memory. One recent study found that this raphe–hippocampus pathway plays a critical role in regulation of hippocampal activity and likely associated memory consolidation processes. It has been shown that the MRN is a contributor of serotonergic agents, especially 5-HT to the hippocampus. These findings, together with the demonstration that serotonergic agents block Long Term Potentiation (LTP) and  5-HT antagonists enhance LTP and/or memory makes it clear that the MRN plays a part in formation of long term memory in the hippocampus.

The MRN was found to play a vital role in hippocampal desynchronization; it exerts an inhibitory effect on the mechanism for hippocampal theta wave generation. Also, median raphe nucleus suppresses theta bursts of the medial septal area neurons. Numerous studies reveal that lesions in the MRN continuously caused ongoing theta activity, and when the MRN was injected with pharmacological agents, the neurons displayed inhibited activity or reduced excitatory to drive them to produce theta at short latencies and for long durations. Therefore, MRN is a functional antagonist of the reticular formation which plays a critical role in hippocampal theta generation.

Function 
The MRN plays a role in the serotonin pathway. According to the study by Van De Kar and Lorens, it is the main source of 5-hydroxytryptamine (5-HT) to other parts of the brain. 5-HT is another name for serotonin which is a neurotransmitter that is affected by many physical and emotional processes, including depression, mood, social functioning, exercise, and diet. The MRN, when stimulated, significantly increases the amount of 5-HT present in the brain. This aided in forming the conclusion that the neurons in the MRN is the main contributor of 5-HT to the dorsal hippocampus as well as anterior and posterior cortical areas. Furthermore, the MRN was found to an area in the brain that relates to inhibitory control by GABA of serotonin (5-HT). The gamma-Aminobutyric acid (GABA) acts an inhibitory transmitter–when GABA antagonist were injected in the median raphe nucleus of rat, it was found that there was increase in serotonin turnover. Such relationship is also seen in when the MRN is electrically stimulated and as a result behavioral inhibition is induced in rats. These behaviors that are typically seen in rats during stressful situations involved crouching, teeth chattering, piloerection, and micturition. When the MRN is electrically stimulated, the behavioral response was not only suppressed but there was a counteraction with para-chlorophenylalanine (PCPA), a serotonin synthesis inhibitor. Such results demonstrate that the MRN is involved in behavioral inhibition as well.

Another function of the MRN is that it plays a role in depression. It has been discovered that the MRN is one of the few parts of the brain that creates tryptophan hydroxylase. Tryptophan hydroxylase is a rate-limiting enzyme that works with serotonin. When the levels of tryptophan hydroxylase 2 mRNA are elevated then more tryptophan hydroxylase is created. These elevated levels are associated with individuals who present as depressed suicides when compared to the nonpsychiatric controls.  

Besides depression, MRN has been examined for its potential role in anxiety regulation. In examining the MRN, various animal models have shown that an inactivation of neurons containing the serotonin transmitter within the median raphe nucleus led to anxiolysis. Anxiolysis refers to medications or drugs, for example, that results in a calm and relaxed state; it can be used to relieve anxiety or as a sedative. Such relationship suggest that the MRN plays a regulatory function in anxiety.

Research 
The use of microdialysis and voltammetry in studies has indicated that neurotransmitter-mediated responses may be different, and chronic treatment with agonists may differentially regulate the MnR and DnR. Results from these studies have demonstrated  the selective vulnerability of MnR or DnR.

See also
 Raphe nuclei
Serotonin

References

Pons